Ethmia discrepitella is a moth in the family Depressariidae. It is found in Russia (Orenburg Region, Altai and Saratov Region).

The species exhibits distinct sexual dimorphism. Females have strongly shortened forewings and rudimentary hindwings.

The larvae possibly feed on Thalictrum minus.

References

Moths described in 1901
discrepitella